The Rhaetian Railway G 4/5 was a class of metre gauge 2-8-0 steam locomotives operated by the Rhaetian Railway (RhB), which is the main railway network in the Canton of Graubünden, Switzerland.

The class was named G 4/5 under the Swiss locomotive and railcar classification system. According to that system, G 4/5 denotes a narrow gauge steam locomotive with a total of five axles, four of which are drive axles.

The Rhaetian Railway procured a total of 29 examples of the G 4/5 class between 1904 and 1915.  Built as tender locomotives by the Swiss Locomotive and Machine Works (SLM) in Winterthur, the G 4/5s were used mainly on the Albula Railway until that line was electrified in 1919.  Two preserved examples of the class are still in service on the Rhaetian Railway network today.

History 

As early as 1902, the SLM manufactured two four-coupled saturated steam locomotives for the Imperial Railway Company of Ethiopia.  In the same year, trial runs using one of these locomotives were carried out on the Rhaetian Railway.  The positive results of these tests led the Board of the Rhaetian Railway to order four largely identical machines, at a price of 61,500 Swiss Francs per unit.  These G 4/5 class locomotives arrived in Graubünden between June and August 1904, and were given the operating numbers 101 to 104.

The continuing rise in traffic on the Rhaetian Railway soon required more powerful locomotives. The company therefore decided in 1906 to purchase four further G 4/5s of higher performance than the initial batch. While the new G 4/5s nos 105 and 106 were manufactured in the traditional saturated steam configuration, nos 107 and 108 used superheated steam for the first time on the Rhaetian Railway. The performance of the two new sub-types was similar.

As the superheated configuration for the class was now proven, all subsequently ordered G 4/5s were equipped with superheaters.  To 1915, a total of 21 further locomotives, in five separate orders, were so obtained.  The last locomotive, no 129, also received a preheater.  With a total of 29 examples, the G 4/5 also eventually became the largest single class of locomotives on the Rhaetian Railway to this day.

In the meantime, coal shortages during World War I had called into question the further use of steam locomotives.  The Rhaetian Railway had therefore decided to electrify all of its lines on the model of the Engadine Railway, opened in 1913.  The electrification project was able to be completed in 1922.  In 1920, the now surplus locomotives nos. 109, 110 and 111 were sold to the Ferrocarril de la Robla in Spain, and in 1949 those locomotives were followed by nos 102 and 104 to 106.  In Spain, the G 4/5s remained in service until about 1970.  Meanwhile, in 1924, locomotives 101 and 103 went to Brazil.

Locomotives 112 to 129 went in 1926 and 1927 to the Royal State Railways of Siam (now Thailand), where a few examples were in use up to the 1960s.  Locomotive 118 has since been preserved in Chiang Mai as a monument, and locomotive 123 has been kept for display in a railway museum.

Only locomotives 107 and 108 remained at the Rhaetian Railway as non-catenary dependent reserves for snow removal, building work and goods trains.  Since the 1960s, they have also worked increasingly on special trains for railway enthusiasts.  Locomotive 107 is presently stationed in Landquart, while no 108 is based in Samedan.  On the occasion of the Graubünden Steam Festival 2006 and the simultaneous 100th anniversary of the Albula Railway, both locomotives were given names.  Since then, no 107 has carried the name Albula, and no 108 the name Engiadina.

Construction 

The G 4/5 was a four coupled tender locomotive with a leading axle in a swivelling pony truck.  Whereas the first six examples were delivered as saturated steam compound locomotives, all of the remaining examples came into service as superheated machines with single stage steam expansion.

To increase manoeuvreability on curves, the second and fourth coupled axles could each swing  radially in both directions. Drive was to the third coupled axle. The outside cylinders were inclined at 1 in 20 on the saturated steam engines, and on the superheated engines the incline was 1 in 40. On the saturated steam engines, the high-pressure cylinder was on the right hand side of the locomotive, and the low-pressure cylinder on the left hand side.

The two-stage cylindrical boiler had over 176 tubes on locomotives 101 to 104, and on locomotives 105 and 106 the number was increased to 196. The superheated machines 107 to 129 each had more than 112 heating and 18 smoke tubes, and a Schmidt type superheater. The boiler itself was connected with a smokebox set on a cast-iron saddle attached firmly to the frames, while the steel firebox rest upon the frames and moves freely to compensate for temperature induced elongation. On both sides of the boiler are flanked with a high-level frame. As a unique example, locomotive No. 129 was fitted with a preheater. This was mounted on the right side of the locomotive, below the high-level frame.

To reduce the travel times of fast trains between Chur and St Moritz, locomotives nos 105 onwards were given larger tenders. Only in Thusis was it still necessary for locomotives with the larger tenders to take on coal and water. From locomotive No. 123, the tenders were increased in size again. The further enlarged tenders had an unaltered coal capacity, but held  of water.

Illumination of the initial batch of locomotives was by means of kerosene lanterns.  By contrast, the locomotives delivered from 1906 onwards were fitted with electric lights.  These were powered by an accumulator, which was charged by a generator attached to one of the rear axles of the tender.  Locomotives nos 102 and 104, which remained with the Rhaetian Railway after 1924, were retrofitted during their service life with electric lights powered by a battery with no generator.

The braking system consisted of a hand-powered spindle brake operating on the tender axles, and a Hardy-type vacuum brake operating on the first and third coupled axles and both tender axles.  For service on the inclined sections, a supplementary counter-pressure brake of Riggenbach type was fitted.

List of locomotives

References

Literature

External links

Verein Dampffreunde der Rhätischen Bahn
Photo of the memorial locomotive G 4/5 No. 118 in Chiang Mai, Thailand

This article is based upon a translation of the German language version as at December 2009.

SLM locomotives
Preserved steam locomotives of Switzerland
2-8-0 locomotives
Rhaetian Railway locomotives
Steam locomotives of Spain
Steam locomotives of Brazil
Steam locomotives of Thailand
Railway locomotives introduced in 1904
Compound locomotives
Metre gauge steam locomotives
1′D n2v locomotives
1′D h2 locomotives